Diades of Pella ( Diadis Pelleos), surnamed the "Besieger" ( Poliorkitis), was a Thessalian inventor of many siege engines, student of Philip II's military engineer Polyidus of Thessaly.

He lived in the 4th century BC. Diades accompanied Alexander the Great in his campaigns to the East. He constructed (or improved) movable towers, battering rams, scaling engines used to scale walls and battering cranes used for the destruction of city walls.
Diades was known as "the man who took Tyre with Alexander".
He also  wrote a treatise on machinery. (Vitruvius vii, introduction)

Notes

External links
Technology museum of Thessalonica

Ancient Greek military engineers
Engineers of Alexander the Great
Ancient Greek engineers
Ancient Thessalians
Ancient Pellaeans
Hellenistic military engineers
4th-century BC Greek people
Year of death unknown
Year of birth unknown